NK Solin is a Croatian football club based in the town of Solin, near Split, playing in the 2. HNL, the Croatian second division.

History
Arguably the team's greatest success was winning the 1980–81 Croatian league, which earned Solin promotion to the 1981–82 Yugoslav Second League. They would play two seasons in the second division.

The club was named MAR Solin from 1991 to 1994 and NK Solin Kaltenberg from 1995 to 1997.

As of 2019, the club have played in the 2.HNL for all but two seasons since Croatian independence.

Players

Current squad

Recent seasons

External links
Official website

References

Association football clubs established in 1919
Football clubs in Croatia
Football clubs in Split-Dalmatia County
1919 establishments in Croatia